The Cathedral of Saint Joseph or simply Pontianak Cathedral is a parish of the Roman Catholic Church in Pontianak, West Kalimantan, Borneo, Indonesia. It is the mother church and seat of the Metropolitan Archdiocese of Pontianak. It is under the pastoral responsibility of Archbishop Agustinus Agus.

An apostolic prefecture for what was then called Dutch Borneo was erected in 1905, and the Capuchins established themselves in Pontianak. The first church in the city was completed in 1908 and consecrated the following year. It was designated 

By 2011 the congregation had far outgrown the original structure, which was demolished. The new cathedral church, which opened December 19, 2014, is one of the largest in the region. It was formally dedicated on 19 March 2015, the Feast of Saint Joseph. Throughout its history it has been staffed by priests of the Capuchin Order.

It was elevated to cathedral status on January 3, 1961 with the elevation of Pontianak as an archdiocese (Archidioecesis Pontianakensis or Keuskupan Agung Pontianak) through the bull "Quod Christus" Of Pope John XXIII.

See also
Catholic Church in Indonesia
List of cathedrals in Indonesia

References

External link

Roman Catholic cathedrals in Indonesia
Roman Catholic churches completed in 2014
Buildings and structures in Pontianak
Churches in Borneo
21st-century Roman Catholic church buildings
Religious organizations established in 1905